Edgars Piksons (born 17 July 1983) is a former Latvian biathlete. He represented Latvia at the 2006 and 2010 Winter Olympics. At Biathlon World Championships 2011 he got 8th place in the sprint.

In November 2014, the news broke that Piksons had tested positive for the banned substance 19-Norandrosterone after a practice competition in Priekuļi on 22 September. He waived the right to have a B-sample tested. Piksons denied having knowingly taken any banned substances, but announced his retirement from professional sports.

References

External links 
 IBU profile
 
 
 

1983 births
Living people
People from Cēsis
Latvian male biathletes
Biathletes at the 2006 Winter Olympics
Biathletes at the 2010 Winter Olympics
Olympic biathletes of Latvia
Doping cases in biathlon
Latvian sportspeople in doping cases